The Nimr is a family of all-terrain military armored personnel carrier (APC) vehicles, co-developed with Military Industrial Company and produced by Nimr LLC in the United Arab Emirates. The Nimr is designed specifically for military operations in the harsh desert climates found in the Middle East.

Development 
The Nimr is a multipurpose vehicle intended to address the requirements for replacement of existing 4×4 light tactical vehicles, primarily in the Middle East and Asia.

Production of the first prototype of Nimr vehicles was conducted by engineers from a subsidiary of GAZ and the first prototype of the vehicles was introduced in 2000. Further development was undertaken by Bin Jabr Group which teamed up with Rheinmetall and MBDA to incorporate air defense and anti tank defense mechanisms called NIMRAD and NIMRAT. The first Nimr vehicle was unveiled to the public in IDEX 2007.

In February 2009, Bin Jabr group and Tawazun Holdings set up a joint venture to produce the vehicle which was called Nimr Automotive LLC.

The production facilities are located in the Tawazun Industrial Park in Abu Dhabi.

In July 2012, Algeria and the United Arab Emirates signed an agreement for production of the armored vehicle in Algeria for the North African market.

Types

AJBAN 
 AJBAN 420
 AJBAN 440
 AJBAN 440A (Equipped with anti-tank guided missiles)
 AJBAN 447
 AJBAN 447A
 AJBAN 450
 AJBAN ISV Internal Security Vehicle
 AJBAN LRSOV Special Operations Vehicle (SOV)
 AJBAN VIP

HAFEET 
 HAFEET Class:
 HAFEET 620
 HAFEET 620A Logistics and Utility Vehicle
 HAFEET 640A Artillery Support Vehicle (Observation and Command & Control configurations)
 HAFEET APC
 HAFEET Ambulance

JAIS 
 JAIS Class:
 JAIS 4x4
 JAIS 6x6

Operators

Potential operators

References

External links 
Nimr II datasheet in arymrecognition.com

Military trucks
Off-road vehicles
Armoured fighting vehicles of the post–Cold War period
Military vehicles of the United Arab Emirates
Military light utility vehicles
Military vehicles introduced in the 2000s
Wheeled armoured personnel carriers